The World Eightball Pool Federation (WEPF) is an international pool governing body overseeing international tournaments and rankings in the British-originating variant of eight-ball pool played with red and yellow unnumbered balls instead of the stripes and solids numbered balls. WEPF competes for authority and membership with the World Pool-Billiard Association (WPA), which oversees its own tournaments and slightly different rules under the name blackball. WEPF events are held principally in the United Kingdom and Commonwealth of Nations.

Overview
The WEPF was established in 1992 by founding member countries Australia, England and New Zealand. The governing body runs its own world championships, separate from those held by the WPA.

Each country under the WEPF has their own referee and umpire body and each country has their own qualification structure in place for grading referees. For instance, South Africa has three basic certificates: League Referee, Provincial Referee and National Referee. Australia is also most complimented on their good governance and structure of their referee/umpire body.

The rules of the game are available on the WEPF website with calling procedures and guidance.

Member countries
  - Australian Eight Ball Federation
 
 
 
  - English Pool Association
  and Reunion Island
 
 
 
 
 
 
 
  - Clubs New Zealand 8Ball
 
 
 
  - Pool South Africa

World Eightball Pool Championship

The WEPF World Eightball Pool Championship (sometimes branded the Foster's World Eightball Pool Championship for sponsorship purposes) is held annually, and features open, women's, and juniors' divisions. The tournaments are regularly held at the Imperial Hotel in Blackpool, England. The competition includes players from Europe and from further afield, including Australia and South Africa.

See also
 List of World Eight-ball Champions

References

External links 
 World Eightball Pool Federation Official website

Pool organizations
International sports organizations